Nicholas Financial is a consumer and auto loan company based in Clearwater, Florida. It was founded in 1986 and trades under the symbol NICK. As of 2012, it had 60 branch offices in Florida, Ohio, North Carolina, Georgia, Alabama, Kentucky, Indiana, Tennessee, Michigan, Missouri, South Carolina, Virginia, Maryland and Illinois. Peter Vosotas is the company's founder and chief executive.

In December 2013, Prospect Capital Corporation declared to acquire 100% of the common stock of Nicholas Financial Inc., which failed to close in April 2014. Doug Marahon is the company's current CEO since December 2017. CEO Ralph Finkerbrink, retired in September 2017, after 25+ years of service to the company.

Furlough 
Nicholas Financial is scaling down in April 2020, in the wake of the financial burden of the emerging COVID-19 pandemic. In a Form 8-K with the U.S. Nicholas Financial Inc., reported that it would immediately furlough 40 employees, or around 15% of its staff. The consumer finance firm also confirmed that it would shutter seven of its branches.

References

External links
Nicholas Financial Website

Financial services companies of the United States